The 2006 Java earthquake may refer to:
 2006 Yogyakarta earthquake
 2006 Pangandaran earthquake and tsunami

See also
List of earthquakes in Indonesia